is a Japanese ice dancer. With her skating partner, Daisuke Takahashi, she is the 2022 Four Continents silver medalist, the 2022-23 Japanese national champion and the 2022 Denis Ten Memorial Challenge champion.

With her former skating partner, Chris Reed, she is the 2018 Four Continents bronze medalist, the 2017 Asian Winter Games silver medalist, and a three-time Japanese national champion (2016–2018). They competed in the final segment at five ISU Championships and the 2018 Winter Olympics.

Personal life 
Kana Muramoto was born on March 3, 1993, in Akashi, Hyōgo, Japan. She is the younger sister of former figure skater Satsuki Muramoto. In 2011, she graduated from Canadian Academy, an international school in Kobe, Japan.

Career

Early career 

Muramoto began learning to skate in 1998. Through the 2013–2014 season, she competed in ladies' singles, coached by Mie Hamada and Yamato Tamura. She won the silver medal at the 2011 Triglav Trophy and bronze at the 2011 Crystal Skate of Romania.

In the 2014–2015 season, Muramoto began appearing in ice dancing with Hiroichi Noguchi. The two placed fourth at the 2014 Tallinn Trophy and took the bronze medal at the Japan Championships.

2015–2016 season: Debut of Muramoto/Reed 
On June 17, 2015, Muramoto and Chris Reed announced that they would compete together, coached by Marina Zueva, Oleg Epstein, and Massimo Scali in Canton, Michigan.

Making their international debut, Muramoto/Reed placed 7th at the 2015 NHK Trophy in November. The following month, they won the Japanese national title. In January 2016, the duo took silver at the Toruń Cup in Poland. They placed 7th at the 2016 Four Continents Championships in February in Taipei, Taiwan. In March, they placed 16th in the short dance, 14th in the free dance, and 15th overall at the 2016 World Championships in Boston, Massachusetts.

2016–2017 season
Muramoto/Reed won silver at the 2016 CS U.S. Classic in September and placed 8th at the 2016 Skate America in October. They withdrew from their November Grand Prix event, the 2016 NHK Trophy. After winning their second national title, the duo took bronze at the 2017 Toruń Cup.

In February, Muramoto/Reed placed 9th at the 2017 Four Continents Championships in Gangneung, South Korea, and won silver at the 2017 Asian Winter Games in Sapporo, Japan. In March, they placed 23rd in the short dance at the 2017 World Championships in Helsinki, Finland. As a result, they did not advance to the final segment and missed qualifying for the Olympics.

2017–2018 season: Pyeongchang Olympics
Muramoto/Reed began their season in September, taking bronze at the 2017 CS U.S. Classic. At the end of the month, they competed at the 2017 Nebelhorn Trophy, the final qualifying opportunity for the Olympics. The two won the silver medal and secured one Olympic spot in the ice dance discipline for Japan. In November, they appeared at a pair of Grand Prix events, finishing 9th at the 2017 NHK Trophy and 7th at the 2017 Skate America.  They then won their third national title, outscoring the silver medalists by nearly 17 points.

In January, Muramoto/Reed won the bronze medal at the 2018 Four Continents Championships in Taipei, Taiwan. In February, they competed at the 2018 Winter Olympics in PyeongChang, South Korea. They placed 15th in the short dance, 13th in the free dance, and 15th overall. The following month, they finished 11th at the 2018 World Championships in Milan, Italy.

2018–2019 season: End of Muramoto/Reed
Muramoto/Reed were assigned to the 2018 NHK Trophy and 2018 Rostelecom Cup. However, on August 9, 2018, Japanese news media reported that they had ended their partnership and that Muramoto planned to search for a new partner.

2020–2021 season: Debut of Muramoto/Takahashi
In September 2019, Muramoto formed a new partnership with former Japanese singles skater Daisuke Takahashi, with plans to debut in the fall of 2020. The decision of Takahashi, a former Olympic bronze medalist and World champion in men's singles, to switch to ice dance attracted considerable media attention both in Japan and abroad. The two began training in Florida under Marina Zoueva, the coach of Olympic champions Virtue/Moir and Davis/White.

Due to the COVID-19 pandemic, the Grand Prix was assigned based primarily on geographic location. Muramoto/Takahashi nevertheless traveled from Florida to Japan to make their debut at the 2020 NHK Trophy, in a field consisting of only three Japanese dance teams.  They were second in the rhythm dance, narrowly ahead of reigning national silver medalists Fukase/Zhang but some six points behind the reigning national champions, Komatsubara/Koleto. In the free dance, Takahashi fell out of his second set of twizzles, which combined with missed levels of some lift elements to drop them to third place. Winning the bronze medal, he called his mistakes unusual, even in practice sessions, but a part of actually competing. Muramoto said she felt they could do better at their next competition.

Making their Japan Championships debut, Muramoto/Takahashi placed second in the rhythm dance, less than four points behind Komatsubara/Koleto.  They were third in the free dance after Takahashi fell out of a lift and made several other errors, but won the silver medal overall due to Fukase/Cho also making errors. They were named as first alternates to the World team. In February, they were forced to withdraw as alternates due to a knee injury to Muramoto and were replaced by bronze medalists Fukase/Cho.

2021–2022 season: Four Continents silver
Muramoto/Takahashi were again assigned to begin the season at the 2021 NHK Trophy, their lone assignment on the Grand Prix for the year. Sixth in both segments, they were sixth overall, defeating domestic rivals Komatsubara/Koleto by 7.30 points. Both expressed satisfaction with the results, but Takahashi said, "there is still a large gap we want to close to the top teams." They went on to win a silver medal at the 2021 CS Warsaw Cup.

The 2021–22 Japan Championships, the final national qualification event for the 2022 Winter Olympics, pitted Muramoto/Takahashi against Komatsubara/Koleto for the second time that season. Muramoto and Takahashi both fell in the rhythm dance, as a result placing second in that segment, five points back of their rivals. They won the free dance but took the silver medal overall for the second consecutive year and were subsequently named as alternates for the Japanese Olympic team. They were instead assigned to make their World Championship debut later in the season and were named to compete at the Four Continents Championships as well.

Muramoto/Takahashi won the silver medal at Four Continents, placing second in both segments. Muramoto, reflecting on her prior medal at the event, said, "I share precious memories with Chris regarding ice dancing, and we were also aiming for a victory. But I am also very happy that I was able to reach the podium with Dai and compete with the world."

The team concluded the season at the 2022 World Championships, held in Montpellier with Russian dance teams absent due to the International Skating Union banning all Russian athletes due to their country's invasion of Ukraine. Qualifying to the free dance, Muramoto/Takahashi finished sixteenth.

2022–2023 season: First international gold 
At the end of May, Muramoto/Takahashi confirmed that they would continue through the 2022–2023 season.

After a sixth-place finish at the 2022 Skate America, they went on to compete at the 2022 CS Denis Ten Memorial Challenge, where they earned their first gold medal as a team. They then finished sixth at the 2022 NHK Trophy, their second Grand Prix.

At the 2022–23 Japan Championships, Muramoto/Takahashi became national champions for the first time and were subsequently named to compete at the 2023 World Championships and at the 2023 Four Continents Championships.

The team encountered difficulties at the Four Continents Championships, beginning in the rhythm dance, where Muramoto fell in the midst of their midline step element. Takahashi fell twice in the second half of their free dance. They finished ninth at the event, behind domestic rivals Komatsubara/Koleto.

Programs

With Takahashi

With Reed

With Noguchi

Ladies' singles

Competitive highlights
GP: Grand Prix; CS: Challenger Series; JGP: Junior Grand Prix

With Takahashi

With Reed

With Noguchi

Ladies' singles

Detailed results

With Takahashi

References

External links 

 
 
 
 

Japanese female ice dancers
Japanese female single skaters
Figure skaters at the 2017 Asian Winter Games
Medalists at the 2017 Asian Winter Games
Asian Games silver medalists for Japan
1993 births
Living people
Kansai University alumni
Sportspeople from Hyōgo Prefecture
Figure skaters at the 2018 Winter Olympics
Olympic figure skaters of Japan
Asian Games medalists in figure skating
People from Akashi, Hyōgo
Four Continents Figure Skating Championships medalists